The City Council of Dresden is the elected representative body of the citizens of Dresden that administers the affairs of Dresden a self-governing city kreisfreie Stadt in the Free State of Saxony.

Municipality and city council

City council
The city council defines the basic principles of the municipality by decrees and statutes. The council gives orders to the burgomaster by voting for resolutions and thus has some executive power. It is elected by the citizenry for a legislature of five years by an election system of three votes per citizen. There an advisory councils for local affairs of senior citizens and immigrants. The ten Ortsamtsbereiche (districts) have an advisory council which has to be heard in district affairs. The Ortschaften (former boroughs) have even smaller councils, which can decide even more freely in local affairs.

, the 70 seats of the city council were distributed as follows:

City Mayors

The Supreme Burgomaster is directly elected by the citizens for a term of seven years. Executive functions are normally elected indirectly in Germany. However, the Supreme Burgomaster shares a lot of executive rights with the city council. Governing majorities can be in opposition to the Supreme Burgomaster. He is the head of the municipality, is responsible for the city's operative affairs, and is ceremonial representative of the city. The highest departments of the municipality are managed by seven burgomasters. The First Burgomaster (currently the burgomaster of culture) is also the deputy to the Supreme Burgomaster.

The current holder of the office is Dirk Hilbert (Free Democratic Party); he was elected in July 2015 by 54 per cent of the vote.

Municipality
The municipality is divided into seven departments and the Mayor's Office.

 The department of general administration is responsible for the municipality's civil servants, information technology and the administration of the schools in the city.
 The department of finance and real estates is responsible for the city treasury. The city agencies of real estates, taxes and civil engineering are responsible to that department.
 The department of public order and security is responsible for fire and civil protection, food control and the hospitals in the city. The city agencies of public order and law, as well as the civil registry office, are responsible to that department.
 The department of culture is responsible for the municipal museums and libraries. The agency of monument conservation is responsible to that department. A lot of the cultural institutions in Dresden are directly responsible to the Free State of Saxony, as are the state art collections and the opera house.
 The department of social affairs is responsible for the municipal kindergartens. The agencies of youth welfare, health and social welfare are responsible to that department. Social welfare is a matter of the cities and communities in Germany.
 The department of urban development is responsible for mobility and central technical services. The agency of city development, construction inspection, land surveying and streets and excavation are responsible to that department.
 The department of economy is responsible for the wastewater and the cemeteries. The agencies of business development, green spaces and wasting as well as the environmental agency are responsible to that department.

The City of Dresden owns a lot of institutions and enterprises. Some of them are private companies (for example the Dresdner Verkehrsbetriebe (transport authorities), the DREWAG (public services and energy supply), the Messe Dresden (fair ground) or the Zoo Dresden (which is a non-profit GmbH: a limited liability company).

Local affairs

 
Local affairs in Dresden often center around the urban development of the city. Architecture and design of public places is a specifically controversial subject. The reconstruction of completely destroyed buildings around the Frauenkirche at the Neumarkt square as well as the completely modern Wiener Platz square in front of the Hauptbahnhof train station have been criticized. The building of the Waldschlösschen Bridge  led the UNESCO World Heritage Committee to remove the Dresden Elbe Valley from the list of World Heritage Sites.

In 2006 Dresden sold its publicly subsidized housing organization, WOBA Dresden GmbH, to the US-based private investment company Fortress Investment Group. The city received 987.1 Million Euros and paid off its remaining loans, making it the first large city in Germany to become debt free. Opponents to the sale were concerned about Dresden's loss of control on the subsidized housing market, with that control going to an American private company. The long-term risks were a subject of discussion in national media as were the chances of such sales in other cities.

A new soccer stadium, the Glücksgas Stadium, was built between 2007 and 2010.

Coat of arms

Official documents and publications by the City Council of Dresden still use the histrionic coat of arms: Showing on a golden shield showing a black lion with and two black pales. The lion is looking has a red tongue.

References

External links
 Official site

Dresden
Dresden
Politics of Dresden